Mount Anderson is a high mountain in the northern part of the Sentinel Range in Ellsworth Mountains, Antarctica.  Probuda Ridge is trending northeast of the peak, and Embree Glacier and Ellen Glacier's tributary Fonfon Glacier drain its northeastern and eastern slopes respectively. It is part of the same massif as Mount Bentley and Mount Sisu.

The mountain was discovered by the Marie Byrd Land Traverse Party, 1957–58, under Charles R. Bentley, and named for Vernon H. Anderson, glaciologist at Byrd Station, 1957, a member of the party.

See also
 Mountains in Antarctica

Maps
 Vinson Massif.  Scale 1:250 000 topographic map.  Reston, Virginia: US Geological Survey, 1988.
 Antarctic Digital Database (ADD). Scale 1:250000 topographic map of Antarctica. Scientific Committee on Antarctic Research (SCAR). Since 1993, regularly updated.

Notes

References
 AntarcticMountains.com 
 SCAR Composite Antarctic Gazetteer.

Ellsworth Mountains
Mountains of Ellsworth Land
Four-thousanders of Antarctica